Dasineura pudibunda is a species of gall midges, insects in the family Cecidomyiidae.

References

Further reading

 
 

Cecidomyiinae
Articles created by Qbugbot
Insects described in 1862

Taxa named by Carl Robert Osten-Sacken
Gall-inducing insects
Diptera of North America